Kožany is a village and municipality in Bardejov District in the Prešov Region of north-east Slovakia.

History
In historical records the village was first mentioned in 1427.

This village is well known by the wooden church, which was built in the past and now it is attraction for the tourists and belongs to the collection of the wooden churches located in the eastern part of Slovakia.

Geography
The municipality lies at an altitude of 244 metres and covers an area of 5.201 km².
It has a population of about 140 people.

Genealogical resources

The records for genealogical research are available at the state archive "Statny Archiv in Presov, Slovakia"

 Greek Catholic church records (births/marriages/deaths): 1817-1939 (parish B)

See also
 List of municipalities and towns in Slovakia

External links
 
https://web.archive.org/web/20090621123522/http://www.statistics.sk/mosmis/eng/run.html
Surnames of living people in Kozany

Villages and municipalities in Bardejov District
Šariš